NBA ShootOut 98, known in Europe as Total NBA 98, is a video game developed by Sony Interactive Studios America and published by Sony Computer Entertainment for the PlayStation in 1998. It is the third installment of the NBA ShootOut series. The cover features Hakeem Olajuwon of the Houston Rockets.

Gameplay
ShootOut 98 features rosters from the 1997–98 NBA season. For the first time in the series, Shaquille O'Neal and Charles Barkley were both added to the game, although Michael Jordan did not appear in the game, and was still represented by a custom player named "Roster Guard" on the Chicago Bulls.

The game introduces a system called "icon cutting", which allows players to control cutters, screens, and double teams.

Reception

One of the defining features of the game was the ability to shatter the backboard with a slam dunk, subsequently causing an injury labeled as “glass in eye”. The game received "average" reviews according to the review aggregation website GameRankings.

References

External links
 

1998 video games
Basketball video games
PlayStation (console) games
PlayStation (console)-only games
Sony Interactive Entertainment games
Video games developed in the United States
Video games set in 1998
Video games set in the United States